Totally Driven is a greatest hits album by British hard rock band Uriah Heep, released on 12 November 2015 on their own label, Uriah Heep Records. The album contains re-recorded versions of 27 of their best known songs, recorded with the long-standing 1986-2007 lineup.

The album was originally released in 2001 with a different track order as Remasters: The Official Anthology, but it went out of print quite quickly and was forgotten about. It was reissued in 2004 as Uriah Heep's Gold: Looking Back 1970-2001 without the band's knowledge by a European budget label.

According to guitarist Mick Box, the songs were recorded in preparation for the Acoustically Driven and Electrically Driven concerts.

Track listing

Personnel 
Uriah Heep
 Bernie Shaw – lead vocals
 Mick Box – guitar, backing vocals
 Phil Lanzon – keyboards, backing vocals, string arrangements
 Trevor Bolder – bass, backing vocals
 Lee Kerslake – drums, backing vocals

Additional musicians
Melvin Duffy – pedal steel, slide guitar
Stefan Hannigan – uillean pipes, percussion
Kim Chandler – flute, backing vocals
Sarah Chi Liew, Liz Chi Yen Liew – violins
Pauline Kirke – cello
Saskia Tomkins – viola
Billie Godfrey, Emma Robbins – backing vocals

Production
Pip Williams – acoustic guitar, string arrangements, producer
Mike Pietrini – remastering

References

External links 
 Totally Driven announcement on Uriah-Heep.com
 Remasters: The Official Anthology at Discogs (list of version)

2015 albums
Uriah Heep (band) albums